Powell Creek, Powells Creek or Powell's Creek may refer to:

In Australia
Powells Creek (Sydney), a tributary of the Parramatta River in New South Wales

In the United States
 Powell Creek, West Virginia, an unincorporated community in Boone County
 Powells Creek (Hyco River tributary), a stream in North Carolina and Virginia
 Powell Creek (Pennsylvania), a tributary of the Susquehanna River in Dauphin County
 Powell's Creek (James River tributary), a stream in Virginia
 Powells Creek (Potomac River tributary), a stream in Virginia